The Anglian was an English car manufactured in Beccles, Suffolk from 1905 to at least 1909.  The automobiles featured either a 3½ hp single-cylinder De Dion engine or 5 hp "twin coupled" power units. It appears the company mainly made tricars, but a photo of a 1909 four-wheeled Anglian car, the first car to be used by East Suffolk Police indicates they did not just make tricars.

See also
 List of car manufacturers of the United Kingdom

Brass Era vehicles
Defunct motor vehicle manufacturers of England
Companies based in Suffolk
Beccles